Ortho effect refers mainly to the set of steric effects and some bonding interactions along with polar effects caused by the various substituents which are in a given molecule, resulting in changes in its chemical and physical properties. In a general sense, the ortho effect is associated with substituted benzene compounds.

There are three main ortho effects in substituted benzene compounds:

 Ortho effect in substituted benzoic acid (first ortho effect): Ortho-substituted benzoic acids are stronger acids than their meta and para isomers, regardless of the nature of the substituent
 Ortho effect in substituted aniline (second ortho effect/SIP effect): Ortho-substituted anilines are weaker bases than their meta and para isomers, regardless of the nature of the substituent
 Ortho effect in electrophilic aromatic substitution of disubstituted benzene compounds (third ortho effect): It refers to the set of steric effects which determines the regioselectivity of an incoming electrophile in  disubstituted benzene compounds where a meta-directing group is meta to an ortho–para-directing group.

First ortho effect in substituted benzoic acids 
When any group is present at ortho to carboxyl group in substituted benzoic acid then the acidic character of that compound becomes at least more than benzoic acid. Generally ortho-substituted benzoic acids are stronger acids than their meta and para isomers also. The table given below shows pKa values of various monosubstituted benzoic acids.
 The ortho effect is large for the nitrobenzoic acids, which show nearly a 20 fold increase in acidity, roughly an 8 fold factor for the halobenzoic acids, and a 2.5 to 3 fold increase for methyl and cyano substituents.
 The methoxybenzoic acids are exceptional, in that the ortho and meta isomers have nearly identical pKa's (ca. 4.1), presumably due to the exceptional p-π electron donation from oxygen.

General explanation for first ortho effect 
When a group is present ortho to carboxylic acid group in substituted benzoic acid, the steric hindrance forces the carboxyl group to twist out of the plane of the benzene ring. This inhibits the resonance of carboxyl group with phenyl ring which increases the acidity of carboxyl group which was otherwise reduced due to destabilizing cross conjugation. In-fact this destabilizing cross conjugation is also accounted as the reason for decreased acidity of benzoic acid as compared to formic acid.

Also the presence of a hydrogen bond donor near a carboxyl group may act to enhance its acidity, as demonstrated by the three isomeric hydroxy-benzoic acids (refer the table above). Intramolecular hydrogen bonding of an ortho OH donor to the carbonyl oxygen of the carboxyl group, acting as an acceptor, increases the positive charge on the carbonyl carbon and consequently the acidity of the carboxyl OH.

pKa values

Second ortho effect: ortho effect in substituted aniline (steric inhibition of protonation). 
When any group is present at ortho to NH2 in aniline then the basic character of that compound becomes at least less than aniline. For example, see the order of basicity of following substituted aniline:-
 p-Toluidine > m-Toluidine > Aniline > o-Toluidine
 Aniline > m-Nitroaniline > p-Nitroaniline > o-Nitroaniline
 Aniline > p-Haloaniline > m-Haloaniline > o-Haloaniline
 p-Aminophenol pKb=8.50 > o-Aminophenol pKb=9.28 > Aniline pKb=9.38 > m-Aminophenol pKb=9.80

General explanation for second ortho effect 
 The protonation of Substituted aniline is inhibited due to steric hindrance. Upon protonation the hybridization of Nitrogen in amino group changes from sp2 to sp3 making the group non planar. This causes the steric hindrance between the ortho substituted group and H atom of amino group which makes the conjugate acid less stable, hence decreases the basicity of substituted aniline (see the figure on right).

Third ortho effect: ortho effect in electrophilic aromatic substitution of disubstituted benzene compounds 

When a meta-directing group is meta to an ortho–para-directing group, the incoming group primarily goes ortho to the meta-directing group rather than para. This is called the ortho effect. There is no good explanation yet for the ortho effect, though possibly there is intramolecular assistance from the meta-directing group. For example, the electrophilic aromatic nitration of 1-methyl-3-nitrobenzene affords 4-methyl-1,2-dinitrobenzene  and 1-methyl-2,3-dinitrobenzene in 60.1% and 28.4% yields, respectively. In contrast, 2-methyl-1,4-dinitrobenzene (2c) is isolated in only 9.9% yield. As witnessed in the above example, when a π-acceptor substituent (πAS) is meta to a π-donor substituent (πDS), the electrophilic aromatic nitration occurs ortho to the πAS rather than para.

Similar results were also observed on the nitration of 3-methylbenzoic acid in which 5-methyl-2-nitrobenzoic acid and 3-methyl-2-nitrobenzoic acid were obtained as the major compounds, whereas 3-methyl-4-nitrobenzoic acid was reported as a minor compound. Also in nitration of  the nitration of 3-bromobenzoic acid  5-bromo-2-nitrobenzoic acid (83%yield)  was obtained as major product and 3-bromo-2-nitrobenzoic acid (13% yield) as minor. On an interesting note the potential isomer 3-bromo-4-nitrobenzoic acid was not detected.

Ortho effect in Diels-Alder reactions 
In normal electron demand Diels-Alder reactions, the Z-substituted dienophiles react with 1-substituted butadienes  to give 3,4-disubstituted cyclohexenes, independent of the nature of diene substituents. This is also known as ortho effect.

Notes

References

External links 
 Supplemental Topics § The Ortho Effect – Department of Chemistry, Michigan State University

Organic chemistry
Benzene
Isomerism